MetraLabs GmbH, develops and produces Mobile Robotic Platforms for the industrial and the commercial market. MetraLabs was founded in 2001 in Ilmenau, Germany. 

MetraLabs has served companies throughout Germany in all different types of field:  Roger and Ally in the Real (Handelskettes) supermarket consulting customers about products,  For the project with Infineon Technologies the two robots AMOR received the "it-innovation prize". MetraLabs, which was reviewed and published in the Gartner "Cool Vendors in Retail 2010", have a developed and implemented the SCITOS A5, a mobile service-guide, to help customers find products within a store and deliver overall information about products. The SCITOS A5 was also decorated with the Thuringia State Research Award (Thüringer Forschungs Preis im Bereich Transfer). The MetraLabs SCITOS G5, is an autonomous mobile platform that is compatible with a multitude of additional instruments and devices to carry out specified tasks, ranging from logistical tasks, moving objects from one place to another, as well measurements within laboratories. .

MetraLabs is one of the developers of MIRA (Middleware for Robotic Applications), which is a cross-platform, open-source software framework for robotic applications.

Research
MetraLabs was founded by graduates of the Ilmenau University of Technology and has a connection with the University Neuroinformatics and Cognitive Robotics Lab headed by Professor Groß. Together they have worked on multiple projects. One of such projects is the development of a senior citizen assistant robot.

References

External links
 MetraLabs
 http://www.tu-ilmenau.de/fakia/Presse.4616.0.html

Robotics companies of Germany
Companies based in Thuringia
Companies established in 2001
German brands
Ilmenau